Labeobarbus jubbi is a species of ray-finned fish in the genus Labeobarbus from the central Congo Basin in Angola and The Democratic Republic of the Congo. It may be threatened by pollution and sediment runoff from diamond mining activities in its area of occurrence. It is fished for in artisanal fisheries.

References 

 

jubbi
Taxa named by Max Poll
Fish described in 1967